U-31 (S181) is a Type 212A submarine of the German Navy, and the lead ship of her class.

U-31 was built by TKMS, with construction taking place at the shipyards of Thyssen Nordseewerke of Emden and Howaldtswerke at Kiel. Launched on 20 March 2002, U-31 was commissioned alongside her sister ship U-32 by German Minister of Defence Peter Struck in Eckernförde on 19 October 2005. U-31 is propelled by one diesel engine and an electric motor driven by nine fuel cells, making the submarine virtually undetectable.

Korvettenkapitän Bert Petzold is the submarine's commanding officer.

History
U-31 was built in two sections, the stern and propulsion by Nordseewerke, Emden and the bow at Howaldtswerke-Deutsche Werft, Kiel. The boats of the Type 212A class cost around 500 million euros to build. Equipped with fuel cell technology and stealth skin, they are almost undetectable, and are able to remain submerged for up to three weeks. The fuel cells are virtually emission free, with the exception of distilled water, resulting in less noise, heat and exhaust fumes.

U-31 and U-32 were commissioned in a joint ceremony at Eckernförde on 19 October 2005 by Defence Minister Peter Struck, in the presence of the Inspector of the Navy Vice- Admiral Wolfgang E. Nolting. They and their sister ships are stationed in Eckernförde and form part of the 1st Ubootgeschwader (1st Submarine Squadron) in Einsatzflottille 1.

References 

Specific

External links 
 Norddeutscher Rundfunk: "die nordstory: " (Video, German, English subtitles; 58:30 min). TV documentation about U-31 crossing the North Sea on a surface run during a European windstorm in 2014.

Type 212 submarines of the German Navy
Ships built in Emden
Ships built in Kiel
2002 ships
Submarines of Germany
Attack submarines